The Threshold of a Persona is a 2009 TVB television drama from Hong Kong produced by Marco Law. It was broadcast between June and July 2009. The drama features the work of the Immigration Department of Hong Kong.

Cast

Viewership ratings

References

External links
 The Threshold of a Persona official website 
 The Threshold of a Persona - summary and screen captures 

TVB dramas
2009 Hong Kong television series debuts
2009 Hong Kong television series endings
Works about immigration